National Highway 77  is a National Highway of India entirely within the state of Bihar that links Hajipur to  Sonbarsa near India-Nepal border, and is  long.

See also 
 National Highway
 List of National Highways
 National Highways Development Project
The National Highway has very important from commercial Point view as it connects North Bihar with South Bihar. It also important because it directly connects south Bihar with the International Border of Nepal.

References 

77
National highways in India (old numbering)